France Saint-Louis (born October 17, 1958) is a Canadian ice hockey coach and retired player. She was a member of the Canadian women's national ice hockey team for nearly a decade, winning gold medals at five IIHF Women's World Championships and a silver medal at the inaugural women's ice hockey tournament at the 1998 Winter Olympics. At the age of 40, she retired from the Canadian Olympic Program to launch her own hockey school. She served as a consultant to the Montreal Carabins women's ice hockey program from 2008 to 2016 and currently teaches at the Cégep du Vieux Montréal.

Playing career

Ice hockey
In the 1980s, St. Louis competed for the Ferland Quatre Glaces (first based out of Brossard, and then Repentigny) team in the League Régionale du Hockey au Féminin in the province of Québec. She participated in the 1987 Women's World Hockey Tournament and was Canada's leading scorer. St. Louis was a member of the Canadian Hockey Team from 1990 to 1999. She was part of the first five women's teams to win gold at the IIHF Women's World Championships. She won the gold medal at the 1996 Three-Nation Cup and the gold medal at the 1996 Pacific Rim. She was also an assistant coach for Team Quebec at the 1991 Canada Winter Games. France St. Louis was the Most Valuable Player of the 1998 Esso Nationals as Team Quebec finished in third place and was awarded the Maureen McTeer Trophy.

Lacrosse
In addition to hockey, St. Louis was an accomplished lacrosse player. She was a member of the Canadian Team from 1985 to 1989. She participated at the World Championships in Australia (1989) and the World Championships in Philadelphia (1986), where Canada finished in fourth place. St. Louis was part of the team that won the Gold medal at Canadian Championships in 1989.

Career stats

Coaching
As part of the IIHF Ambassador and Mentor Program, St. Louis was a Hockey Canada coaching mentor that travelled to Bratislava, Slovakia to participate in the 2011 IIHF High Performance Women's Camp from July 4–12.

As of 2010, St. Louis was a consultant to the Montreal Carabins women's ice hockey program.

Awards and honours
 Inducted into the Panthéon des sports du Québec Sports Hall of Fame (2003)
 Quebec Athlete of the Decade in Lacrosse (1980 to 1990)
 Quebec Athlete Award of Excellence in Women's hockey (1986 and 1991)
 Captain of the Canadian Women's team (1992–1994)
 Assistant captain of the Canadian Women's hockey team (1997)
 Named Most Valuable Player on her team at the Canadian Championships (1998, 1997, 1991, 1990, 1988)
 Nominated for Teammate Award of Excellence by the Quebec Hockey Federation (1994 and 1990)
 2014 recipient of the Order of Hockey in Canada

References

External links
  France St-Louis – Biography
 (French) Coach profile on Carabins Website 2010–11
 (French) Tellement sport report on Radio-Canada.ca

1958 births
Living people
Canadian women's ice hockey forwards
Sportspeople from Laval, Quebec
Ice hockey players at the 1998 Winter Olympics
Medalists at the 1998 Winter Olympics
Olympic ice hockey players of Canada
Olympic medalists in ice hockey
Olympic silver medalists for Canada
Order of Hockey in Canada recipients
Ice hockey people from Quebec